Ahmad Raheel Al Dhufairi is a Kuwaiti football player playing for Al-Arabi SC in the Kuwait Premier League and for the Kuwait national football team playing mainly as a defender.

Career statistics

Club

International

References

Living people
1996 births

Kuwaiti footballers
Al-Arabi SC (Kuwait) players
Association football forwards
Kuwait international footballers
Sportspeople from Kuwait City
Al-Nasr SC (Kuwait) players
Kuwait Premier League players